Izabela Lemańczyk (née Śliwa) (born 11 December 1990) is a Polish volleyball player who plays for MKS Dąbrowa Górnicza. She played for the under-18 and under-20 teams of Poland women's national volleyball team.

Personal life
Her mother is Magdalena Śliwa, a double European Champion (2003, 2005), who played 359 matches for Poland women's national volleyball team. Izabela and her mother played together in the same team - Atom Trefl Sopot during the 2010–11 season.

Clubs
  Wisła Kraków (2006–2009)
  Atom Trefl Sopot (2009–2011)
  KS Murowana Goślina (2011–2012)
  KPS Chemik Police (2012–2013)
  VT Aurubis Hamburg (2013–2014)
  VC Wiesbaden (2014–2015)
  Muszynianka Muszyna (2015–2016)
  MKS Dąbrowa Górnicza (2016–present)

Sporting achievements

Clubs

National championships
 2010/2011  Polish Championship, with Atom Trefl Sopot

References

External links
 Player profile  at Orlen Liga
 Profile at CEV

1990 births
Living people
Sportspeople from Kraków
Sportspeople from Lesser Poland Voivodeship
Polish women's volleyball players